DOGTV is a premium cable television network and the first television network that is made specifically for dogs. The network was founded in equal parts by Ron Levi and Guy Martinovsky, its first CEO, that sold his shares later To Jasmine Group. DOGTV provides 24/7 digital TV programming that is designed to provide entertainment for dogs.  
The programming, created with the help of dog behavior specialists, is color-adjusted to appeal to dogs, and features 3-6 minute segments designed to relax, to stimulate, and to expose the dog to scenes of everyday life such as doorbells or riding in a vehicle. In 2012, the San Diego Humane Society in Escondido installed DOGTV for their shelter dogs.

Founding 
The idea for DOGTV came from founder, Ron Levi and his cat named Charlie. “He just gave me the saddest eyes one day,” Levi said of Charlie when he was leaving the house one day. This prompted Levi to edit videos of squirrels, birds and fish for Charlie to enjoy while he was away.

Launch 
DOGTV initially launched in Israel. In February 2012, DOGTV launched in a test market in San Diego, California through Cox and Time Warner, where people and dogs were able to experience the channel for free. The successful launch in this test market set the stage for a commercial launch nationwide on DirecTV.

Programs  

DOGTV has three types of programs that cycle throughout the day.

Stimulation 
Stimulation episodes show dogs playing in a field, graphics accompanied by engaging sounds and visits to the dog park from the dog's perspective.

Relaxation 
Relaxation episodes play soft music, with calm scenes like animals at a safari, or dogs napping at home.

Exposure 
Exposure episodes focus on potential sounds a dog might hear in common environments such as thunderstorms, vacuum cleaners and fireworks.

Available markets 
DOGTV is available in the U.S., Mexico, Brazil, Portugal, South Korea, China, UK, Australia and New Zealand. In the U.S. the channel is available on DirectTV, Dish, Xfinity, Cox, RCN, Sling TV and supported streaming devices.

Supported devices 
Supported DOGTV devices include:

Streaming media players 
 Apple TV (4th generation & 4K)
 Amazon Fire TV
 Roku 
 Chromecast

Smart TVs 
 Samsung Smart TV (2016 & higher models only)
 Roku Smart TV

Game consoles 
 Xbox Series (Series S and Series X)

Mobile 
 iOS mobile devices (10.x or higher)
 Android mobile devices

Computer 
 macOS
 Windows

Discovery partnership 
In 2014 Discovery made a strategic investment in DOGTV, and became a minority stake holder in the company.

References

External links 
 Official website

Dog equipment
English-language television stations in the United States
Television channels and stations established in 2012
2012 establishments in the United States